is a junction passenger railway station located in the city of Suzuka, Mie Prefecture, Japan, operated by the private railway operator Kintetsu.

Lines
Ise-Wakamatsu Station is a station on the Nagoya Line and is located 40.8 rail kilometers from the terminus of the line at Kintetsu Nagoya Station. It is also a terminus for the Suzuka Line, and is located 8.2 rail kilometers from the opposing terminus of the line at Hiratachō Station.

Station layout
The station consists of two island platforms serving four tracks, connected by a footbridge.

Platforms

Adjacent stations

History
Ise-Wakamatsu Station opened on December 22, 1917 as a station on the Ise Railway. The Ise Railways Kambe Spur Line (which was renamed the Suzuka Line in 1963) started operations from December 20, 1925. The Ise Railway became the Sangu Express Electric Railway’s Ise Line on September 15, 1936, and was renamed the Nagoya Line on December 7, 1938. After merging with Osaka Electric Kido on March 15, 1941, the line became the Kansai Express Railway's Nagoya Line. This line was merged with the Nankai Electric Railway on June 1, 1944 to form Kintetsu. The station building was modified with overpasses connecting the platforms in 1967

Passenger statistics
In fiscal 2019, the station was used by an average of 1135 passengers daily (boarding passengers only).

Surrounding area
 Mie Prefectural Road No. 6 Yokkaichi Kusunoki Suzuka Line
 Mie Prefectural Road 552 Ise-Wakamatsu Stop Line
 Suzuka City Wakamatsu Elementary School

See also
List of railway stations in Japan

References

External links

 Kintetsu: Ise-Wakamatsu Station

Railway stations in Japan opened in 1917
Railway stations in Mie Prefecture
Stations of Kintetsu Railway
Suzuka, Mie